The 1979 National League Championship Series was played between the National League West champion Cincinnati Reds and the National League East champion Pittsburgh Pirates. It was the 11th NLCS in all.

It was the fourth time in the 1970s that the Pirates and Reds had faced off for the pennant; Cincinnati had won all three previous meetings in 1970, 1972 and 1975. 

The Pirates won the series in a three-game sweep in what would be the last postseason appearance for both franchises until 1990.

As of 2022, this is the last time that the Pirates played in the World Series.

Summary

Pittsburgh Pirates vs. Cincinnati Reds

Game summaries

Game 1

Both sides threw their aces in Game 1 as 14-game winner John Candelaria started for the Pirates, and Tom Seaver started for the Reds. After Omar Moreno grounded out to start the game, a 45-minute rain delay stalled the contest. When play resumed, Seaver retired Tim Foli and Dave Parker for an unusually long 1-2-3 inning.

Pittsburgh struck first in the third inning when second baseman Phil Garner led off with an opposite-field home run. After Candelaria struck out, Omar Moreno hit a sinking liner to right that Dave Collins attempted a sliding shoestring catch on.  The ball skidded off the wet Riverfront Stadium turf in front of Collins and rolled to the wall.  The speedy Moreno ended up with a triple, but it could have easily been an inside-the-park homer if not for the hustle of Héctor Cruz in center.  Foli then drove in Moreno with a sacrifice fly to give the Pirates a 2–0 lead.  Seaver then walked Dave Parker and Willie Stargell, but John Milner popped out to end the inning.  The Reds tied it in the bottom of the fourth when George Foster hit a two-run homer into left center with Dave Concepción aboard.  Despite a sore shoulder, Candelaria gutted out seven painful innings before giving way to Enrique Romo.

The score stayed at 2–2 until the top of the 11th inning. Tim Foli and Parker singled off Reds reliever Tom Hume. Willie Stargell drilled a three-run homer to almost dead center to make it 5–2, Pirates.  The Reds didn't go away silently, though.  After Grant Jackson retired the first two batters in the bottom of the 11th, Dave Concepción singled and George Foster walked.  Don Robinson came on to replace Jackson and walked Johnny Bench to load the bases.  At that point, Chuck Tanner visited the mound, and Willie Stargell jokingly asked Robinson, "Why don't you move to first and I'll pitch?"  The barb relaxed Robinson, who settled down and struck out Ray Knight for the final out.

Game 2

In another extra inning affair, the Pirates beat the Reds 3–2 to earn a road sweep and send the series to Pittsburgh needing just one win in three home games to make the 1979 World Series. The starting pitchers were Jim Bibby for the Pirates and Frank Pastore for the Reds.

Pastore helped himself with an RBI sacrifice fly to center in the bottom of the second that scored Dan Driessen. Driessen was aboard after singling and moving to third on a Ray Knight single.  In the top of the third, Tim Foli and Dave Parker led off with singles.  Willie Stargell followed with a base hit to right, but he rounded first base too far and Reds right fielder Dave Collins threw behind him.  Stargell was caught in a rundown and retired.  Foli, however, surprisingly stayed at third instead of trying to score while Stargell was in the rundown.  John Milner was walked intentionally, loading the bases, and Bill Madlock beat out a double-play grounder to score Foli with the tying run.

The Pirates took the lead in the fifth when Phil Garner sent a sinking liner towards Dave Collins in right that Collins attempted a shoestring catch on, much like his attempt in Game 1.  Collins appeared to have caught the ball, but umpire Frank Pulli ruled he trapped it, giving Garner a base hit.  Garner moved to second on a sacrifice bunt by Bibby and scored on a double by Foli.  Bibby left after seven innings with discomfort in his neck, having held the Reds to four hits and the single run.

The Reds mounted a threat in the eighth against the Pirate bullpen.  Left-hander Grant Jackson retired lefty-hitting Joe Morgan for the first out, but Chuck Tanner, managing by percentages, brought in Enrique Romo to face right-handed hitting Dave Concepción.  The move backfired as Romo gave up back-to-back singles to Concepción and George Foster.  Kent Tekulve relieved Romo to face Johnny Bench and, on his second pitch to Bench, wild-pitched the runners to second and third.  Tekulve recovered to strike out Bench, intentionally walked Dan Driessen, and then retired Ray Knight for the last out.

Tekulve encountered trouble in the ninth.  With one out, Héctor Cruz, batting for Tom Hume, doubled.  Collins then doubled in Cruz to tie the game.  Tekulve was then replaced by lefty Dave Roberts, but Roberts walked Morgan.  Tanner then brought in Game 1 saver Don Robinson, who struck out Concepción and retired Foster on a groundout to end the threat.

The Pirates won it in the tenth when Moreno singled, went to second on a bunt by Foli and scored on Parker's single. Robinson retired the Reds in the tenth and the Pirates had a two games to none lead over the Reds. Robinson got the win and Doug Bair got the loss.

Game 3

The Pirates made it to their first World Series since 1971 with a blowout win to complete a three-game sweep of the Reds. The starting pitchers were Bert Blyleven for the Pirates, and Mike LaCoss for the Reds. For the second time in three games, the start was delayed by rain.

After allowing a hit in the first, the Pirates got on the board quickly when leadoff hitter Omar Moreno, a pain in the Reds' side all series, singled and stole second.  Tim Foli then grounded to Concepcion, who tried to catch Moreno at third, but Moreno reached third safely and Foli to first.  Dave Parker then hit a sacrifice fly for a 1–0 Pirates lead.

In the second, Phil Garner tripled and scored on Foli's sacrifice fly. LaCoss was then replaced by Fred Norman, who gave up Willie Stargell's second home run of the series and another homer to Bill Madlock in the third.  Stargell doubled home two more runs in the fourth for a 6–0 Pirate lead and essentially clinched the NLCS MVP.

The Reds got one run back in the sixth when Johnny Bench homered, but it was their last run of the year. The Pirates got that run back in the eighth when Garner scored on an error by Cesar Geronimo, the only error committed in the entire series. Blyleven went the distance and the Pirates had completed an unexpected sweep in advancing to the 1979 World Series. To date, this is the Pirates' most recent pennant.

Composite box
1979 NLCS (3–0): Pittsburgh Pirates over Cincinnati Reds

References

External links
1979 NLCS at Baseball Reference

National League Championship Series
National League Championship Series
Pittsburgh Pirates postseason
Cincinnati Reds postseason
National League Championship Series
National League Championship Series
1970s in Cincinnati
1970s in Pittsburgh
National League Championship Series
Baseball competitions in Cincinnati
Baseball competitions in Pittsburgh